Pemberton Creek is a  long 1st order tributary to the Cape Fear River in Bladen County, North Carolina.

Course
Pemberton Creek rises on the Browns Creek divide about 3.5 miles south-southwest of White Lake, North Carolina.  Pemberton Creek then flows southeast to join the Cape Fear River about 2 miles southeast of Elizabethtown, North Carolina.

Watershed
Pemberton Creek drains  of area, receives about 49.3 in/year of precipitation, has a wetness index of 569.34 and is about 7% forested.

See also
List of rivers of North Carolina

References

Rivers of North Carolina
Rivers of Bladen County, North Carolina
Tributaries of the Cape Fear River